The 2015 International Championship was a professional ranking snooker tournament that took place between 25 October and 1 November 2015 at the Baihu Media Broadcasting Centre in Daqing, China. It was the third ranking event of the 2015/2016 season.

Ricky Walden was the defending champion, but he lost 4–6 against Tian Pengfei in the qualifying round.
 
John Higgins won his 28th ranking title, defeating David Gilbert 10–5 in the final.

Prize fund
The breakdown of prize money for this year is shown below:

 Winner: £125,000
 Runner-up: £65,000
 Semi-final: £30,000
 Quarter-final: £17,500
 Last 16: £12,000
 Last 32: £7,000
 Last 64: £4,000

 Televised highest break: £1,000
 Total: £657,000

Wildcard round
These matches were played on 25 October 2015.

Main draw

Final

Qualifying
These matches took place between 30 September and 3 October 2015 in Barnsley, England. Matches involved Ricky Walden, Liang Wenbo, Ding Junhui and Stuart Bingham, were played on 25 October 2015 in China. All matches were best of 11 frames.

Century breaks

Qualifying stage centuries

 142  Mark Allen
 136, 111  Liam Highfield
 134  Shaun Murphy
 133, 106  Marco Fu
 133  Matthew Selt
 132, 121  Luca Brecel
 131  Ben Woollaston
 131  Mark Joyce
 129, 125  Jack Lisowski
 128  Sanderson Lam
 122  Michael Holt
 120  Rod Lawler

 120  Dechawat Poomjaeng
 118  Mark Selby
 110  Allan Taylor
 105  Adam Duffy
 105  Ryan Day
 104  Thepchaiya Un-Nooh
 104  Peter Ebdon
 103  Yu Delu
 103  Lee Walker
 102  Anthony McGill
 102  Cao Yupeng
 100  Ali Carter

Televised stage centuries

 142  Zhao Xintong
 141, 108  Jimmy Robertson
 138, 129, 113, 108, 106, 103, 101  John Higgins
 138, 115  Zhou Yuelong
 138  Cao Yupeng
 137, 106, 105, 101, 100  Marco Fu
 137  Ben Woollaston
 130, 112, 112, 105, 100  David Gilbert
 127, 127, 104  Neil Robertson
 126, 118, 100  Mark Allen
 124  Xiao Guodong
 121, 101  Liang Wenbo
 121  Graeme Dott

 118  Ross Muir
 115, 100  Mark Selby
 112, 111, 108  Ryan Day
 112  Barry Hawkins
 110, 106  Tian Pengfei
 110  Dominic Dale
 110  Peter Ebdon
 108  Fang Xiongman
 105  Martin O'Donnell
 103  Thepchaiya Un-Nooh
 100  Jack Lisowski
 100  Fergal O'Brien
 100  Sam Craigie

References

2015
2015 in snooker
2015 in Chinese sport
Sport in Daqing